{{Infobox person
| name         = Audrey Fleurot
| image        = Audrey Fleurot 2014.jpg
| caption      = Fleurot in February 2014
| birth_date   = 
| birth_place  = Mantes-la-Jolie, France
| education    = École nationale supérieure des arts et techniques du théâtre in Lyon
| occupation   = Actress
| years_active = 2000–present
| partner      = Djibril Glissant
| children     = 1
}}

Audrey Fleurot (born 6 July 1977) is a French actress. She  is best known for playing the Lady of the Lake in Kaamelott, Joséphine Karlsson in Spiral and Hortense Larcher in Un village français.  In 2011, she played Magalie in the international hit film The Intouchables.

Early life

Fleurot was born in Mantes-la-Jolie, west of Paris, and graduated from the École nationale supérieure des arts et techniques du théâtre in Lyon in 2000. 

Career
Her breakout roles came in 2005, when she played the Lady of the Lake in Kaamelott, and took the part of ambitious lawyer Joséphine Karlsson in the police procedural series Spiral. In 2011, she had a role in Woody Allen film Midnight in Paris, though Audrey was disappointed that her part was largely cut during editing. In the same year, she played a supporting role in the French film Intouchables, which went on to be an international success. in 2015, she appeared in the first season of Call My Agent!, playing herself. In 2019, she starred in the successful mini-series Le Bazar de la Charité'' which aired on TF1 and Netflix.

Personal life
She is in a relationship with actor-director Djibril Glissant. In November 2015, she gave birth to their first child, a son named Lou.

Theatre

Filmography

References

External links 

 
 

1977 births
People from Mantes-la-Jolie
French film actresses
Living people
French television actresses
21st-century French actresses
French stage actresses